Gençlik Hülyaları is a 1962 Turkish drama film, directed by Halit Refiğ and starring Kenan Pars, Reha Yurdakul, and Erol Tas.

References

External links

1962 films
Turkish drama films
1962 drama films
Films directed by Halit Refiğ